Albu Soveyt (also Romanized as Ālbū Soveyţ; also known as Ālbū Savāţ and Shaţţ-e ‘Attābīyeh) is a village in Hoveyzeh Rural District, in the Central District of Hoveyzeh County, Khuzestan Province, Iran. At the 2006 census, its population was 194, in 36 families.

References 

Populated places in Hoveyzeh County